Pleiocarpa pycnantha is a plant in the family Apocynaceae.

Description
Pleiocarpa pycnantha grows as a shrub or tree. Its fragrant flowers feature a white to creamy-yellow corolla.

Distribution and habitat
Pleiocarpa pycnantha is native to an area of Africa from Sudan south to Mozambique and in parts of West Africa. Its habitat is evergreen forest from sea level to  altitude.

References

pycnantha
Flora of Africa
Plants described in 1896